Cynthia Ann LaMontagne (born February 15, 1966) is an American former actress who has appeared in numerous television shows and films. She is best known for her recurring role as "Big Rhonda" in the fourth season of That '70s Show.

Television
  Eyes – Nicole Talbert (2007)
 Criminal Minds – Becky the Reporter (uncredited) (2006)
 Veronica Mars  – Catherine Lenova/Yelena Sukarenko (2005; episode "Ruskie Business")
 Buffy the Vampire Slayer – Lydia (2001—2002; 2 episodes)
That '70s Show – Big Rhonda (2001–2002; 6 episodes)
Frasier – Annie (1998-2001; episode “The Ski Lodge”)
 Maybe This Time – Bethany (1995)
Dharma and Greg –  Sarah Marsh (1999; episode “Looking for the Goodbars”)

Filmography
 Forgetting Sarah Marshall – Female Bartender (2008)
 Would I Lie to You? – Serenity (2002)
American Virgin (2000) – Gloria
Border to Border – The Other Woman (1998)
My Engagement Party – Stacy (1998)
Austin Powers: International Man of Mystery – Fembot (1997)
The Cable Guy – Restaurant Hostess (1996)
Flirting with Disaster – Sandra (1996)
Carlito's Way – Woman at Elevator (1993)

External links

1966 births
American film actresses
American television actresses
Living people
20th-century American actresses
21st-century American actresses